Fort Williams Park is a 90-acre park in Cape Elizabeth, Maine.

Fort Williams may also refer to:

Castle Williams, a War of 1812 fort on Governors Island, New York City
Fort Williams (Alabama), a War of 1812 fort near Talladega Springs
Fort Williams (Maine), a coastal fort in Cape Elizabeth, Maine
Fort Williams (Virginia), a Civil War fort, part of the Defenses of Washington, D.C.

See also
Fort William (disambiguation)